Baq may refer to:
 Baq, Semnan, a village in northern Iran
 Baq, South Khorasan, a village in eastern Iran
 Basque language (ISO 639 identifier "baq")
BAQ may refer to:
 Body Attitudes Questionnaire
 Ernesto Cortissoz International Airport (IATA airport code: BAQ) in Barranquilla, Colombia
 Basic Allowance for Quarters, more commonly known as Basic Allowance for Housing, or BAH, a U.S. military entitlement of money to pay for housing